Zbigniew Eugeniusz Godlewski (3 August 195217 December 1970) was a Polish teenager shot dead by security forces during the 1970 Polish protests in the city of Gdynia.

Biography

On 17 December 1970, during Poland's demonstrations against the Communist regime, the army fired into the crowd of workers emerging from a commuter train in Gdynia, under the pretext of preventing an industrial sabotage action. At least 40 innocent people were killed by police. The image of an anonymous young man's body carried on a door panel through the cordons of police and tanks inspired author Krzysztof Dowgiałło to write the poem about him. The name Janek Wiśniewski was invented by Dowgiałło for the ballad to symbolize an 18-year worker killed by the military or the militia. Not knowing his real name, the author gave him a symbolic name sounding typically Polish; it proved quite enduring. Later it was established by the opposition that the man shot dead was named Zbigniew Godlewski and had lived in nearby Elbląg.

Remembrance 
The song, along with the story of Janek Wiśniewski, was popularized when it was performed at the end of the 1981 movie Man of Iron (by actress Krystyna Janda along with Jacek Kaczmarski). After the fall of communism in Poland, a major street in Gdynia was named after Janek Wiśniewski and also a street in Elbląg was named after Zbigniew Godlewski.

In 2011, a Polish movie about the events of December 17, titled "Czarny Czwartek - Janek Wiśniewski padł" ("Black Thursday - Janek Wiśniewski Has Fallen"), was released in cinemas. The title was inspired by a line in "Pieśń o Janku z Gdyni". The song was covered by Kazik Staszewski and used in the movie trailer.

References

1952 births
1970 deaths
Fictional characters based on real people
Legendary Polish people
Polish murder victims
Polish poems
Polish songs
Victims of human rights abuses
Anti-communism in Poland
Deaths by firearm in Poland